Murder on the Waterfront is a 1943 American drama film directed by B. Reeves Eason and written by Robert E. Kent. The film stars Warren Douglas, Joan Winfield, John Loder, Ruth Ford, Bill Crago and Bill Kennedy. The film was released by Warner Bros. on September 18, 1943.

Plot
Joey and Gloria Davis get married, but Joey must report to service in the Navy before they can have their wedding night.  Joey sneaks his new wife into a heavily secured camp which is watchful due to new top secret information.  When a murder is found, the newlyweds find themselves involved in the investigation.  A mystery ensues, and Gloria may be in danger.

Cast    
Warren Douglas as Joey Davis
Joan Winfield as Gloria Davis
John Loder as Lt. Cmdr. Holbrook
Ruth Ford as Lana Shane
Bill Crago as Lt. Dawson
Bill Kennedy as First Officer Barnes
William B. Davidson as Capt. David Towne
Don Costello as Gordon Shane 
James Flavin as Cmdr. George Kalin

References

External links 
 

1943 films
Warner Bros. films
American drama films
Films directed by B. Reeves Eason
American black-and-white films
1943 drama films
1940s English-language films
1940s American films